The Autocar Company is an American specialist manufacturer of severe-duty, Class 7 and Class 8 vocational trucks, with its headquarters in Birmingham, Alabama. Started in 1897 in Pittsburgh, Pennsylvania, as a manufacturer of Brass Era automobiles, and trucks from 1899, Autocar is the oldest surviving motor vehicle brand in the Western Hemisphere.

Their last cars were produced in 1911; after that the company continued as a maker of severe-duty trucks. In 1953, Autocar was taken over by the White Motor Company, which made Autocar their top-of-the-line brand.  White was taken over in turn by Volvo Trucks in 1981 with Autocar continuing as a division. In 2001, Autocar was acquired by GVW Group, LLC, which revived Autocar as an independent company. Autocar now builds four models of custom-engineered heavy-duty trucks and has regained leading positions in several vocational segments.

History

The company was called the Pittsburgh Motor Vehicle Company when started in Pittsburgh, Pennsylvania, in 1897 but was renamed the Autocar Company in 1899 when it moved to Ardmore, Pennsylvania, outside Philadelphia. One of the company's early cars was the Pittsburgher. By 1907, the company had decided to concentrate on commercial vehicles, and the Autocar brand is still in use for commercial trucks. Autocar is the oldest surviving motor vehicle brand in the Western Hemisphere.

Based on the minutes of company board of directors meetings during 1903–1907 it is known that in 1903 the board of directors included the president, Louis S. Clarke, the secretary, John S. Clarke, as well as, James K. Clarke. Both Louis Semple Clarke and his brother John S. Clarke were members of the fabled South Fork Fishing and Hunting Club of Johnstown Flood fame.

Founder
Autocar founder Louis Semple Clarke (1867–1957) was a successful mechanical engineer. Among Clarke's innovations were the porcelain-insulated spark plug for gasoline engines, a perfected drive shaft system for automobiles, and the first design of a useful oil circulation system.  Other impacts include Clarke's initiative to place the driver on the left hand side of the vehicle which eventually became the standard in much of the automotive industry worldwide. as well as the Autocar thread specification which became the standard in the U.S. automotive industry.

Clarke was also a talented photographer.  His family were members of the exclusive South Fork Fishing and Hunting Club above Johnstown, Pennsylvania, whose earthen dam at Lake Conemaugh burst on May 31, 1889, causing the Johnstown Flood.

Clarke sold his interest in Autocar in 1929 and retired from business.  He died in Palm Beach, Florida, on January 6, 1957, and is buried in Allegheny Cemetery, in Pittsburgh.

Products
 
 

Autocar experimented with a series of vehicles from 1897, with a tricycle, "Autocar No. 1", now in the collection of the Smithsonian. In 1899 Autocar built the first motor truck ever produced for sale in North America. The first production Autocar automobile was a 1900 single cylinder chain drive runabout. About 27 were made. In 1901 Autocar built the first car in North America to use shaft drive. This vehicle is also now in the Smithsonian collection.

The 1904 Autocar was equipped with a tonneau, it could seat four passengers and sold for US$1700. The horizontal-mounted flat twin engine, situated at the front of the car, produced 11 hp (8.2 kW). This was a somewhat unusual engine design for the time, with most companies producing inline designs. A three-speed transmission was fitted. The steel and wood-framed car weighed 1675 lb (760 kg). The early cars had tiller steering.

In 1905, the company was selling the Type XII car for $2,250 and another it called the Type X for $1,000. It discontinued the Type XI and sold the last of them in 1905. The cars then had a wheel steering with left-hand drive.

The Type X was a runabout. During the 1905–1906 model year the company produced 1000 Type X cars. The manufacture of 500 Type XV runabouts was authorized for 1907 in place of 500 touring cars (Type XIV) in addition to the 1000 runabouts already planned. At special meeting on June 19, 1906, held at 711 Arcade Building, Philadelphia, Pennsylvania, the board authorized the hiring of a general manager by the name of Harry A. Gillis at a salary of $10,000 per year. Production of 300 Type XVI cars and 500 Type XVII were authorized during a board meeting on November 21, 1906.

Commercial vehicles were made the focus from 1907 and soon outnumbered cars.

As of 1911, Autocar was making only trucks. The first model, the Type XVII, had a 97-inch wheelbase, a one and a half-ton capacity, and a two-cylinder gasoline engine under the seat. Later engines had 4 and 6 cylinders, and wheelbases became longer. Inline engines became the company's focus.

During World War I, the Canadian Armoured Autocar used an Autocar chassis.

In 1929, Autocar sold 3300 units, though the number fell to 1000 in 1932 and continued to decline during the Great Depression. Larger trucks with "Blue Streak" gasoline engines and Diesel engines, mainly from Cummins, came later.

During World War II, Autocar supplied 50,000 units to the military, including specialty vehicles such as half-tracks; during its entire prewar history, the company had only built 70,000 units. Autocar ranked 85th among United States corporations in the value of World War II military production contracts. Civilian production resumed in 1944 and sales increased greatly after the war. Autocar soon had 100 dealers.

Subsidiary of White Motor Company
The boom after the war ended quickly, however; and in 1953, Autocar sold out to the White Motor Company, which made Autocar their top-of-the-line brand among their "Big Four" brand portfolio. The Ardmore plant was replaced in 1954 with a new plant in Exton, Pennsylvania, though the Ardmore plant burned while being torn down in 1956 and the fire could have destroyed a neighborhood.

Autocar's "Custom Engineering" process for meeting each customer's needs led to a reputation as "World's Finest". White replaced Blue Streak engines with its own Mustang, and production of gasoline-powered trucks ended in 1965.

AP off-road vehicles became an important product for Autocar. The 1964 AP19 shown in September 2007 at a Golden Age Truck Museum exhibit "has a GCW of 900,000 lbs, a 30,000lb front axle, planetary rear axles rated at 200,000 lbs, and was originally powered with a 525 HP Cummins V-12 diesel which was later replaced with a 6-cylinder Cummins KT rated at 750 HP."

Most Autocar trucks continued to use the Autocar Driver Cab; in 1977 Autocar launched the Construcktor 2 model which used the Xpeditor cab that had recently been launched by sister-company, White.

The Exton plant ended production in 1980, with production moving to the modern White plant in Ogden, Utah.

White, Volvo and GMC

Shortly after the move to Utah in 1980, with White insolvent, in 1981 AB Volvo acquired the U.S. assets and brands to become Volvo-White LLC. Volvo produced trucks under both the White and Autocar brands and Autocar continued as the division focused on severe-duty trucks. The Autocar DK severe-duty line was launched in 1983 and, as a replacement of the venerable DC line, was widely used in heavy dump truck, concrete mixer, refuse, and oil field applications, among many others. Also launched in 1983 was the widely admired Autocar AT64F, a top-of-the-line long-haul tractor marketed as "The Legend". The last traditional Autocar with a "Custom Driver Cab" was made in Ogden on December 18, 1987. In 1988, the DK was replaced by the Autocar ACL and ACM models, which used the White Xpeditor cab, first used by Autocar in the Construcktor 2 model. While the AC-series trucks were tough and reliable, they incorporated an expanded number of Volvo components and, for some Autocar loyalists, marked a dilution of the Autocar brand.

Volvo-White bought GMC's heavy truck business in 1987 creating the Volvo WhiteGMC brand. Volvo later dropped any reference to White but used the Autocar bow-tie emblem on the radiator and hood side panels. In 1996 "Autocar" became a truck model name.

Autocar remained a part of Volvo until 2001. When Volvo acquired the North American operations of Renault Trucks in 2000, including its wholly-owned subsidiary Mack Trucks, the merged company would have had an excess or anti-competitive share of the refuse truck market sector. Volvo agreed to sell select designs for the Xpeditor low cab-forward severe-duty products, intellectual properties, and the Autocar brand to Highland Park, Illinois-based Grand Vehicle Works Holdings, LLC (GVW Group). Autocar used the Xpeditor cab developed by White in the Autocar ACL and ACM conventional truck models and had also used it in the earlier Autocar Construcktor 2 conventional truck model, beginning in 1977.

Contemporary activities

Once again independent after nearly 50 years, as of 2021 the Autocar company now employs over 400 at its manufacturing facilities in Birmingham, Alabama (model ACX cabover and model DC trucks) and Hagerstown, Indiana, where the company produces custom-engineered ACMD and ACTT models for severe-duty vocational applications. The company's severe-duty ACX model offers features ranging from improved ergonomic cabs, integrated controls, and complex multiple axle configurations, up to triple-steer, triple-drive 12x6 trucks weighing over 100,000 lbs. The Autocar ACX is now second nationally in several segments, including concrete pump trucks and refuse trucks. The Autocar ACTT is a leading model of terminal tractor. The company has a nationwide service network in the US. Autocar's customer base includes large fleets, private fleets and major municipalities in the United States and Canada such as Miami, Newark, Houston, Chicago and Vancouver.

Autocar announced on September 13, 2017, that it had opened a second, 1.2 million square-foot manufacturing site in Birmingham, Alabama.

Since 2012, Autocar also builds a medium-duty vocational truck series called the Xpert (ACMD). It uses a 2-3 person cab made by Chinese Qixing (QX-PW21TGD). Autocar has also offered the Xpert with dual-steering system for garbage truck service.

Autocar announced on May 7, 2019, the relaunch of the DC conventional truck that had been the core of Autocar's business from the 1950s through the 1970s. The relaunched DC is completely new and reported to have several unique features, such as the first 160,000 PSI steel frame rails, an upgraded electrical system, and a cab that fits three workers and is designed for serviceability, with a full steel structure inside the dashboard and aluminum sheets as dash panels. The first version released is the DC-64R, which is purpose-built for refuse applications. Another unique feature of the DC is that Autocar mounts full roll-off hoist bodies on the Autocar production line, avoiding numerous problems when modifications are made after production. Additional variations of the DC announced include the DC-64D for dump trucks, the DC-64M for concrete mixer trucks, and the DC-64P specifically for concrete pump trucks.

On May 13, 2021, Autocar announced the launch of the E-ACTT, a fully electric terminal tractor. Autocar had first introduced electric trucks in 1923.

Current truck models
 ACMD class 7/8 medium/heavy-duty cabover
 ACTT terminal tractor and E-ACTT electric terminal tractor
 ACX class 8 severe-duty cabover
 DC-64D, DC-84D, DC-64M, DC-64P, & DC-64R conventional trucks

Current truck vocations
 Aircraft and military support trucks, such as tankers and Scissor lift trucks.
 Concrete mixer trucks
 Concrete pump trucks
 Dump trucks
 Refuse trucks
 Road Maintenance trucks, such as Paint Stripers, Heavy-Duty Street Sweepers, and Water Blasters
 Terminal tractors (also known as yard trucks)

Historic trucks

"Delivery Wagon" - The first motor truck in the Western Hemisphere, 1899
Type XVIII - Restart of Autocar truck production, announced 1907
Type XXI - 1910 to 1922
Type XXVI - 4- to 6-ton, 1919-1925
Type XXVII - 2- to 3-ton, 1921-1925
A64, A75 & A102 - Aluminum, lightweight
ACL & ACM - Conventionals, used the Xpeditor cab, 1990 to 2001
ACX E3 - Hydraulic hybrid-drive truck, 2010 to 2017
AP - Extreme-Duty, with planetary axles
AT64F - "The Legend" semi-tractor 1983-1988
AU - Short-hood Aluminum
C - Gasoline Conventionals
CK - Half-Cab
Construcktor (previously KK93) & Construcktor 2 (used the Xpeditor cab)
DC - Diesel Conventional from 1939 to 1984, relaunched in 2019
DCU - Short-hood
 Dispatch
DK - Diesel Conventional from 1984
DS - Lighter-weight trucks for construction and refuse 1983-1987
E1, E3 & E5 - Electric trucks in the 1920s
KK - Construction model from 1974
RB/RL/RM - Conventionals 1937-1940
UD/UN/US/UT, etc. - Engine-under-the-seat/Cabover 1933-1937
UA/UB/U-10 to U-90 - Engine-under-the-seat/Cabover 1935-1952
WX "Xpeditor" - Cabover, 2001 to 2009
WXLL "Xpeditor" - Low-entry cabover, 2001 to 2009

Gallery

References

External links

 

Motor vehicle manufacturers based in Indiana
Emergency services equipment makers
Truck manufacturers of the United States
American companies established in 1897
Vehicle manufacturing companies established in 1897
1897 establishments in Indiana
Brass Era vehicles